Dobi-III is the third and the last aircraft designed by Lithuanian aviator Jurgis Dobkevičius. Fighter Dobi-III was designed and tested in 1924. On June 8, 1926, it crashed at Kaunas Aerodrome killing its designer.

Specifications

See also

Dobi-I
Dobi-II

1920s Lithuanian fighter aircraft
Aircraft first flown in 1924
High-wing aircraft
Single-engined tractor aircraft
Conventional landing gear